My Beautiful Dark Twisted Fantasy is the fifth studio album by American rapper and producer Kanye West. It was released by Def Jam Recordings and Roc-A-Fella Records on November 22, 2010, following a period of public controversy for West. Retreating to a self-imposed exile in Hawaii after a period of controversy in 2009 following his interruption at the MTV Music Awards, he recorded the album at Honolulu's Avex Recording Studio in a communal environment involving numerous musicians. Additional recording sessions took place at Glenwood Place Studios in Burbank, California, and at the New York City studios Electric Lady and Platinum Sound.

My Beautiful Dark Twisted Fantasy was mainly produced by West, alongside a variety of high-profile producers such as Mike Dean, No I.D., Jeff Bhasker, RZA, Bink, and DJ Frank E. Critics noted the music's maximalist aesthetic and opulent production style that utilizes various elements from West's previous work, including soul, pop, baroque, electro, and symphonic sounds, as well as progressive rock influences. The album's lyrics explore themes such as West's celebrity status, consumer culture, self-aggrandizement, and the idealism of the American Dream. Guest vocalists include Nicki Minaj, Rihanna, Jay-Z, Pusha T, Rick Ross, Kid Cudi, John Legend, Bon Iver, and Elton John.

During the album's marketing, West released free songs through his weekly GOOD Fridays series, as well as four singles, including "Power" and "All of the Lights", with all of them becoming top 40 hits on the Billboard Hot 100. West also released an accompanying musical short film, Runaway (2010). The album was an immediate and widespread critical success and was listed as the best album of 2010 in many publications' year-end lists. It was awarded Best Rap Album at the 54th Annual Grammy Awards, alongside winning CD of the Year at the 2011 BET Hip Hop Awards.

My Beautiful Dark Twisted Fantasy debuted at number one on the US Billboard 200, while reaching the top 10 in five other countries, including also topping the Canadian Albums Chart. It eventually registered a triple platinum certification in the United States from the Recording Industry Association of America (RIAA), alongside sales certifications in a few other territories. The album has been played at least a billion times through the music streaming service Spotify. Widely considered West's best album, it is ranked in several curated lists as the best album of the 2010s and among the greatest of all time.

Background 

My Beautiful Dark Twisted Fantasy was conceived during Kanye West's self-imposed exile in Oahu, Hawaii, at Avex Recording Studio in 2009, following a period of public-image controversy. Around a year previously, he had held recording sessions at the studio for his previous album 808s & Heartbreak (2008). West said that fatigue from overworking led to his controversial outburst after Taylor Swift was awarded Best Female Video at  the 2009 MTV Video Music Awards. He was disgusted with the ensuing media response, which led to a brief hiatus from recording.

In response to the backlash to West's behaviour, his scheduled tour Fame Kills: Starring Kanye West and Lady Gaga with recording artist Lady Gaga to promote 808s & Heartbreak was cancelled on October 1, 2009, without an official explanation. In 2013, West explained that the album served as an apology of sorts after his MTV VMAs outburst, detailing that he used the music to become accepted again. He elaborated that a minimum of 80 percent was what he wanted to deliver, with the remainder "fulfilling a perception". West also insisted that he was not "dissing 'Dark Fantasy'", stating he failed to become satisfied, with him openly admitting "and saying the truth".

Recording and production 
My Beautiful Dark Twisted Fantasy was recorded at Avex in Honolulu, Hawaii. Additional recording took place at Glenwood Place Studios in Burbank, California, and at Electric Lady Studios and Platinum Sound Recording Studios in New York City. It was reported that West spent over $3 million provided by his record label Def Jam to record the album, making it one of the most expensive albums ever made. He later explained the initial recording process to Noah Callahan-Bever, Complex editor-in-chief and West's then-confidant, telling him he had resided in Hawaii, and was importing his favorite producers and artists to work on the album, as well as for inspiration. Various contributors engaged in sessions with West for My Beautiful Dark Twisted Fantasy, including Kid Cudi, Elton John, Rick Ross, Pusha T, and Justin Vernon. Other artists recorded vocals for the album, such as M.I.A., Mos Def, Santigold, and Seal. Record producers who contributed in the sessions include: Q-Tip, RZA, Pete Rock, Madlib, Statik Selektah, and DJ Premier. Madlib said he made five beats for the album, while DJ Premier said his beats were ultimately discarded.

West block-booked the three session rooms of Avex simultaneously for 24 hours a day to work on My Beautiful Dark Twisted Fantasy, until he felt it was complete. According to Callahan-Bever, "when [West] hits a creative wall ... he heads to another studio room to make progress on another song". Sheets of paper were posted on one side of the studio including what were dubbed as "Kanye Commandments", such as "No Tweeting" and "No Pictures". West never slept a full night at the location, opting instead to take power naps in a studio chair or couch in 90-minute intervals when working during the night. Engineers worked a similar schedule to West, remaining active 24 hours a day. This heavy work ethic led to West and his crew having a multi-course breakfast at his Diamond Head residence, cooked by the rapper's in-house chefs. Later in the morning after breakfast, West and most of the crew played games of 21 against locals at the Honolulu YMCA for leisure. Kid Cudi smoked marijuana in preparation and worked out on a treadmill, while RZA exercised in the weight room.

Throughout the album's development, West solicited other producers and musicians to weigh in on its music with conversations and contributions at the studio. Observing discussions among them during his visit, Callahan-Bever noted: "Despite the heavyweights assembled, the egos rarely clash; talks are sprawling, enlightening, and productive ... we are here to contribute, challenge, and inspire". In an interview with Callahan-Bever, Q-Tip described the process as "music by committee" and elaborated on its significance to the sessions and West's work ethic:

Rapper Pusha T characterized My Beautiful Dark Twisted Fantasy as "a collage of sounds" and found West's recording methods unorthodox, saying that: "We could easily be working on one song, thinking we're in a mode, and he'll hear a sound from someone like [producer] Jeff Bhasker and immediately turn his whole attention to that sound and go through his mental Rolodex to where that sound belongs on his album, and then it goes straight to that song, immediately." Expressing a similar sentiment, fellow rapper Malik Yusef spoke about the collaborators from genres outside hip hop, specifying, "People laughed at me when I brought Elton John in [...] They're like, 'Elton John ain't hip-hop, Malik.' I'm like, 'Y'all, this is music, motherfuckers.'" DJ Premier recalled that West told him during the production "no electro Preem, I swear no electro". The DJ further stated, "'Ye is still that crazy dude he's always been. He's really focused on making this album raw. So I gave him a banger and he said he wanted two more on top of that one. I'm giving him two more this week."

West ensured that the album's recording sessions were secretive, placing sheets of paper in the studio reading "no tweeting, no talking, no e-mailing", and also prohibiting talking to anyone outside of the location. Pusha T recalled West's attitude in an interview for Rolling Stone, saying that "there happened to be a leak, and I remember Kanye ranting and raving, like, 'Fuck this! We're not going to ever work there again! We're going to work in hotel rooms!" In October 2010, West tweeted that the recording of My Beautiful Dark Twisted Fantasy had been finished. West subsequently recorded in hotel rooms for Watch the Throne, his 2011 collaborative album with Jay-Z.

Musical style 
The music was described as maximalist by Jon Caramanica of The New York Times, who further noted East Coast hip hop elements, and Rolling Stones Rob Sheffield, who observed "hip-hop epics, R&B ballads, alien electronics, [and] prog-rock samples". Various writers also noticed elements from West's previous four albums. Simon Vozick-Levinson of Entertainment Weekly (EW) believed these elements "recur at various points", like the lush soul of 2004's The College Dropout, "the symphonic pomp of [2005's] Late Registration, the gloss of 2007's Graduation", and the "emotionally exhausted" electro of 808s & Heartbreak. The Village Voices Sean Fennessey wrote that West had adopted "the gifts of his handpicked collaborators" from the five years before My Beautiful Dark Twisted Fantasy and utilizes them, sometimes to a heightened degree, "arranging orchestral majesty" as Jon Brion did for Late Registration, "adapt[ing] DJ Toomp's oozing menace" from Graduation, and deploying "Kid Cudi's moaning melodies" that "became elemental" on 808s & Heartbreak.

Numerous critics have made comparison between the album's style and West's earlier records. Pitchforks Ryan Dombal wrote that it is mostly a continuation of Graduation "in its maximalist hip-hop bent, with flashes of The College Dropouts comfort-food sampling and Late Registrations baroque instrumentation" incorporated seamlessly. AllMusic's Andy Kellman echoed this sentiment, but added My Beautiful Dark Twisted Fantasy "does not merely draw characteristics" from all the albums, noting the tracks "sometimes fuse them together simultaneously"; he found the result to be that "the sonic and emotional layers are often difficult to pry apart and enumerate". Kellman felt "All of the Lights" denotes the album's "contrasting elements and maniacal extravagance". David Amidon of PopMatters compared the "underscore as ambitious as the beats upfront" on the songs to West's previous work with Brion, while noting "the pop bombast" of Graduation and 808s & Heartbreak. Conversely, veteran critic Robert Christgau commented that the music abandons the "grace" of West's first two studio albums in favor of "grandiosity" and "sonic luxuries".

The album was described as "the world's first" prog-rap album by Carl Williott of Idolatore. Rolling Stones Christopher R. Weingarten called My Beautiful Dark Twisted Fantasy "a Pink Floyd–sized, King Crimson–sampling 68-minute prog-rap behemoth in the age of shrinking budgets". Ann Powers of the Los Angeles Times observed that the album draws elements from genres "as disparate as progressive rock, obscure soul and old-school rap", resulting in a continuous shift towards a new sound, while Times David Browne felt reassured that not many acts have West's ability to combine different genres. On a similar note, Al Horner from NME called it a rap opera.

Lyrics and themes 

Throughout the album, West's lyrics explore themes of excess, celebrity, grandiosity, self-aggrandizement, self-doubt, romance, escapism, decadence, and sex. My Beautiful Dark Twisted Fantasy also features more open references to drinking and drug usage than West's previous albums. Nathan Rabin of The A.V. Club described it as "darkly funny, boldly introspective, and characteristically fame-obsessed", noting "manic highs and depressive lows" from an emotional standpoint. Christgau finds the album's themes of insecurity and uncertainty to be West's heart and "his message, the reason he's so major", noting the tracks "Hell of a Life" and "Runaway" as examples. Greg Kot, writing in the Chicago Tribune, said West displays a transparency and "almost pathological allegiance" to expressing his raw emotions.

According to Dombal, My Beautiful Dark Twisted Fantasy is "a hedonistic exploration into a rich and famous American id". Chris Martins of Spin said it is an eloquent and largely grandiose production that "owes as much to the artist's self-aggrandizing ego as to the voracious id that would destroy it publicly". Powers interpreted the predominant theme on My Beautiful Dark Twisted Fantasy to be "the crisis of the jet-lagged cosmopolitan ... the exhausted cry of one who's always new in town", going after any goal or girl "in the room, fueled by consumer culture's relentless buzz", though ultimately being unsatisfied. He depicted the songs as "pornographic boasts, romantic disaster stories, devil-haunted dark nights of the soul" and perceived West as being unsure about his own place in the world due to the subject of race, stating that the rootlessness displayed by him "belongs to someone who feels unwelcome everywhere". Powers elaborated that rather than a problem only West has, this is "the curse of what [American author] Michael Eric Dyson has called 'the exceptional black man', embraced for his talents but singled out for the color of his skin". According to Sheffield, the album serves as "a rock-star manifesto for a downsizing world".

Songs 

The album begins with "Dark Fantasy", opened by rapper Nicki Minaj narrating a rework of Roald Dahl's 1982 poem Cinderella. The song introduces the themes of decadence and hedonism, with West musing how it had been planned "to drink until the pain was over/But what's worse, the pain or the hangover?" The track's lyrics contain musical and popular culture references, including fellow rapper Nas, the 1820 short story "The Legend of Sleepy Hollow", and British singer Leona Lewis and her song "Sex on Fire" (2008). "Gorgeous" is an uplifting blues-styled track, which sees West tackling racial injustices. "Power" features a dark production that relies on a sample of King Crimson's "21st Century Schizoid Man" (1969), which Fennessey found to be "apocalyptic". West delves into escapism on the song, mentioning his struggles with the public and narrating his vision of a career suicide.

"All of the Lights" incorporates drum 'n' bass breaks, energetic percussion, and horn instruments. The opening lines mention the death of Michael Jackson and present the narrative of a man who goes through multiple issues including abusing his lover and serving prison time. West enlisted 11 guest vocalists for the song, including Alicia Keys, John Legend, Tony Williams, and Elly Jackson; Rihanna sings the hook. In an interview with MTV, Jackson said of the vocal arrangement, "He got me to layer up all these vocals with other people, and he just basically wanted to use his favorite vocalists from around the world to create this really unique vocal texture on his record, but it's not the kind of thing where you can pick it out". "Monster" is a posse cut that features staccato strings, which invoke paranoia. West raps about using inappropriate methods to drown his pain and Nicki Minaj asserts her queen status on the song. The fellow posse cut "So Appalled" is built around piano and strings, with the performers affirming that "this shit is/fucking ridiculous".

"Devil in a New Dress" is built on a sample of Smokey Robinson's "Will You Love Me Tomorrow" (1960). Its lyrics ranges from lust to heartache, with its sexual and religious imagery described by one critic as "part bedroom allure, part angelic prayer". It is the only track without production by West, yet features his characteristic style of manipulating the pitch and tempo of classic soul samples. "Runaway" contains a piano-based motif comprising a series of uninterrupted descending half and whole notes, with a coda that incorporates cello at first, before a violin section and West's vocoder-singing. West uses the song's lyrics to address public opinion and his character issues, proclaiming a toast to all with those flaws. Fennessey cited "Runaway" as the point in My Beautiful Dark Twisted Fantasy where "self-laceration overtakes chest-beating".

Inspired by West's two-year relationship with model Amber Rose, "Hell of a Life" samples the Mojo Men's "She's My Baby" (1966) and follows a narrative of marrying a porn star. According to Dombal, the song "attempts to bend its central credo—'no more drugs for me, pussy and religion is all I need'—into a noble pursuit ... The song blurs the line between fantasy and reality, sex and romance, love and religion, until no lines exist at all." "Blame Game" is a low-key track that is built around a sample of Richard D. James's piano composition "Avril 14th" (2001), and features additional vocals from Legend. The song focuses on a painful domestic dispute and contains a profane skit by comedian Chris Rock.

"Lost in the World" features tribal drums and prominent samples from the indie folk band Bon Iver's "Woods" (2009), with West applying the sample "as the centerpiece of a catchy, communal reverie". It features several musical changes, beginning with the band's frontman Vernon's faint vocals, followed by 4/4 drums, a gospel chorus, and increased tempo, and a final measured tempo. "Lost in the World" transitions into the closing track "Who Will Survive in America". It serves as the album's coda and samples jazz poet Gil Scott-Heron's "Comment No. 1" (1970), a surrealist piece delivered by him in spoken word about the African-American experience and the fated idealism of the American dream. Scott-Heron's original speech is edited to an excerpt that, according to Kot, "retains its essence, that of an African-American male who feels cut off from his country and culture". By contrast, Fennessey wrote, "It's a too-serious denouement for an album that is more about the self's little nightmares than some aching societal rejection."

Title and packaging 

My Beautiful Dark Twisted Fantasy was once titled Good Ass Job and then as Dark Twisted Fantasy. On July 28, 2010, West announced on his newly registered Twitter account that the former title had been scrapped, "I'm bouncing a couple of titles around now." He later expressed uncertainty about the title in September, tweeting: "I can't decide on my album title [...] uuuugh!!!!" The official title, My Beautiful Dark Twisted Fantasy, was announced by West on October 5, 2010; Good Ass Job was eventually planned as the title of a collaborative album with Chance the Rapper, which never materialized.

The album's artwork, designed by George Condo, shows West being straddled on a couch by an armless winged female, who has fearsome features and a long, spotted tail. Both are nude, with West shown holding a beer. According to Vulture writer Dan Kois, the mythological figure straddling West is "a kind of fragment, between a sphinx, a phoenix, a haunting ghost, a harpy". The artwork was done at Condo's studio, after West visited for several hours and they listened to tapes of the rapper's music. Over the next few days, the painter designed eight or nine paintings for the album. Two of them were portraits of West: an extreme closeup, with mismatched eyes and four sets of teeth; a portrait showing his head, crowned and decapitated, placed sideways on a white slab, pierced by a sword. Condo also came up with a painting of a dyspeptic ballerina in a black tutu and a painting of only the crown and the sword in a grassy landscape. He made five covers, which were all included with the purchase of My Beautiful Dark Twisted Fantasy. A second cover containing painting of a ballerina was posted on the Amazon.com pre-order page. The image was originally intended to be the cover art for "Runaway", but West used a photograph of a ballerina instead. Another painting, The Priest, was completed for the album by Condo, who described it as an attempt to bring depictions of religious figures into the modern world.

West told Condo that he wanted a phoenix painting and after he came up with the artwork, the rapper expressed his admiration for how they both "express ourselves with our truest vision". According to Condo, West requested the original cover image to be provocative enough to be banned by retailers, as a publicity stunt. In October 2010, a month before the album's release, West tweeted: "Yoooo they banned my album cover!!!!! Banned in the USA!!! They don't want me chilling on the couch with my Phoenix!" He also suggested Walmart had rejected the cover and cited the case of rock band Nirvana's 1991 album Nevermind, which featured a photo of a naked baby. West questioned why the band are allowed to have someone nude on their cover, but he "can't have a PAINTING of a monster with no arms and a polka dot tail and wings". In response, Walmart denied West's suggestion in a statement declaring the company's excitement about My Beautiful Dark Twisted Fantasy and its arrival in stores: "We did not reject the cover artwork and it was not presented to us." Certain retailers would not carry the original cover, with West substituting it with Condo's ballerina artwork, while some shipped copies used a pixelated version of the original.

In 2015, Billboard named the album's artwork as the 30th best of all time. The magazine wrote that West "matched the widescreen brilliance of the album's music with boundary-cracking art, including a controversial image of a demonic West being straddled by a nude angel". In 2017, NME listed the cover as the seventh best album artwork of the 21st century so far.

Marketing 

Before the album's release, West initiated the free music program GOOD Fridays through his website beginning August 20, 2010, offering a free download of a new song for each Friday. West tweeted that he was aware "y'all need the music so I'm dropping 1 new song every weekend until Xmas", explaining a release could be a song by him, Jay-Z, or another artist. Titled after his imprint label GOOD Music, the program generated considerable publicity ahead of the release of My Beautiful Dark Twisted Fantasy. Young Money Entertainment online marketing coordinator Karen Civil retrospectively called the program genius, detailing: "He did something no one had ever done before, and at a point when he was the most hated person in music, he brought excitement back with his Friday releases." GOOD Fridays was originally intended to run until December 2010, but West extended it through to January 2011.

On September 12, 2010, West premiered "Runaway" with a live performance at the 2010 MTV Video Music Awards. Three weeks later, on October 2, he performed the song a second time on Saturday Night Live, along with "Power". On October 4, 2010, West announced the album's release date of November 22, after he had previously tweeted that he was "contemplating my album date". The rapper also announced that certain songs from GOOD Fridays would be included on it. My Beautiful Dark Twisted Fantasy was released by Def Jam and Roc-A-Fella on November 22, 2010, being made available for digital download on Amazon at a list price of $3.99, in a partnership between the former label and the company. This coincided with the site's $3 discount promotional offer on MP3 purchases, validated with a code. Four singles were released from the album and became top 40 hits on the US Billboard Hot 100, with the lead single "Power" released on July 1, 2010, charting at number 22. "Runaway" was released on October 4, and reached number 12, while "Monster" and "All of the Lights" were released on October 23, 2010 and January 18, 2011, respectively; they both charted at number 18.

A 35-minute film entitled Runaway, featuring the titular song's official music video, was directed by West and released on October 23, 2010. Filmed in Prague over a period of four days in the summer of 2010, the film stars West and model Selita Ebanks, with the script penned by Hype Williams and the story written by West. West described the video as an "overall representation of what I dream" and a reflection of his feelings throughout life, including a parallel of his situation from 2009 to 2010. West explained that it is "the story of a phoenix fallen to Earth", who he makes his girlfriend, though she faces discrimination and eventually "has to burn herself alive and go back to her world". West elaborated that he had been deeply considering the idea of a phoenix for a while, regarding the possibility of it being parallel to his career: "I threw a Molotov cocktail on my career last year, in a way, and I had to come back as a better person." At one of his screenings for Runaway in Paris, he broke down into tears. Later after another screening in Los Angeles, West said how his music and "art" affects people is his inspiration to continue in his career. The film was included on a bonus DVD for the deluxe edition of My Beautiful Dark Twisted Fantasy.

For initial promotion of My Beautiful Dark Twisted Fantasy, West performed at Macy's Thanksgiving Day Parade in late November 2010. Following the release of the album, West performed headlining sets at several large festivals in 2011, including SXSW, Lollapalooza, Austin City Limits, and Coachella; the latter was viewed by The Hollywood Reporter as "one of the great hip-hop sets of all time".

Sales 
In its first week of release, My Beautiful Dark Twisted Fantasy debuted at number one on the US Billboard 200, selling 496,000 copies. The entry blocked Nicki Minaj's debut album Pink Friday from the top spot with 375,000 sales; the week marked the first time in two years that the chart had two albums bow with over 300,000 units. It also gave West his fourth consecutive US number-one album and surpassed the 450,000 first-week sales of 808s & Heartbreak, with the debut becoming the fourth-best sales week of 2010. The album's first-week digital sales of 224,000 units accounted for 45% of the total and stood as the fourth-highest digital copies for an album in a week.

In its second week on the Billboard 200, My Beautiful Dark Twisted Fantasy descended six places to number seven with 108,000 copies sold, marking a 78% sales decline, while remaining above Pink Friday by one place. The album lasted for 115 weeks on the Billboard 200, and as of July 2013, it has sold 1,300,000 copies in the United States, as reported by Nielsen SoundScan. By June 2011, the album had sold 483,000 digital copies, ranking as the second best-selling digital rap album ever. On November 23, 2020, My Beautiful Dark Twisted Fantasy was certified triple platinum by the Recording Industry Association of America (RIAA) for pushing 3,000,000 certified units in the US. According to Billboard, as of 2022, My Beautiful Dark Twisted Fantasy is one of the 15 best-performing 21st-century albums without any of its singles being number-one hits on the Hot 100.

My Beautiful Dark Twisted Fantasy became West's fourth number one album on the Canadian Albums Chart. It reached number four on the Danish Albums chart, and in March 2021, was certified double platinum by IFPI Danmark for shipments of 40,000. My Beautiful Dark Twisted Fantasy opened at number six on the ARIA Albums chart and on September 10, 2021, it was awarded a double platinum certification from the Australian Recording Industry Association (ARIA) for over 140,000 copies shipped in Australia. The album charted within the top 10 in Norway, South Korea, New Zealand, and Switzerland. In 2018, it was reported that My Beautiful Dark Twisted Fantasy had been streamed a billion times on Spotify.

Critical reception 

My Beautiful Dark Twisted Fantasy was met with widespread critical acclaim. At Metacritic, which assigns a normalized rating out of 100 to reviews from professional publications, the album received an average score of 94, based on 45 reviews. Aggregator AnyDecentMusic? gave it 8.8 out of 10, based on their assessment of the critical consensus.

In a November 2010 review, Andy Gill of The Independent praised the album as "one of pop's gaudiest, most grandiose efforts of recent years, a no holds-barred musical extravaganza" that abandons "any notion of good taste" from the beginning. Ann Powers, writing for the Los Angeles Times, found the music comparable to Pablo Picasso, meeting "the Cubist mandate of rearranging form, texture, color and space" for suggesting new viewpoints. The album was also called West's most lavish record in a review by Time magazine's David Browne, who said it proved again that few other artists shared his ability to adeptly mix diverse elements. Dan Vidal of Urb highlighted the rapper's ability to bring the best out of his collaborators, drawing a comparison to the work of Miles Davis.

Rolling Stone chief critic Rob Sheffield called My Beautiful Dark Twisted Fantasy West's best and most wildly inspired album upon its release, asserting that no other act was recording music as dark or uncanny; he added the rapper transgresses the very conventions he had established for rap and pop music in the past five years. Steve Jones of USA Today echoed this sentiment, declaring that West "unleashes an array of sonic flavors — old school hip-hop, progressive rock, R&B, classical music — and deftly mixes and matches them", concluding his only predictability is a consistent drive to make every project his best. The Village Voices Sean Fennessey found the album skillfully engineered and sequenced because of the way each song transitions over "like some long night out into the hazy morning after". Esteemed reviewer Robert Christgau, in MSN Music, hailed the album as a "world-beating return to form" for West. Pitchfork awarded the album a 10/10, the first perfect score the publication had given to a new release since Wilco's Yankee Hotel Foxtrot in 2002.

Some reviewers were more qualified in their praise. For The Guardian, Kitty Empire was critical of West's lyrics calling women "ruthless money-grabbers" on an otherwise "herculean" and "flawed near-masterpiece". AllMusic writer Andy Kellman found West's rapping inconsistent on "a deeply fascinating accomplishment" in his catalogue and one of complicated merit: "As fatiguing as it is invigorating, as cold-blooded as it is heart-rending, as haphazardly splattered as it is meticulously sculpted, [the album] is an extraordinarily complex 70-minute set of songs." Spin journalist Chris Martins felt that a number of songs could benefit from a shorter length, yet called My Beautiful Dark Twisted Fantasy "a sinister, orchestral, hugely grandiose affair" and the music "dark, twisted, and beautiful".

Rankings 
At the end of 2010, numerous critics and publications included My Beautiful Dark Twisted Fantasy on their year-end top albums lists. Many named it the best album of 2010, including Billboard, Time, Slant Magazine, Pitchfork, Rolling Stone, and Spin. My Beautiful Dark Twisted Fantasy was voted best album in The Village Voices Pazz & Jop critics' poll for 2010, winning by the largest margin in the poll's history with 3,250 points. "Power", "Runaway", and "Monster" were voted in the top-10 of the Pazz & Jop singles list. Metacritic, which collates reviews of music albums, identified it as the best-reviewed album of 2010. The album stood as the first rap release to achieve this since Outkast's 2000 album Stankonia and the sixth-highest ranking of albums released in the 2010s to have at least 15 professional reviews.

My Beautiful Dark Twisted Fantasy later appeared on decade-end best albums lists. In 2012, Complex included it on their list of "25 Rap Albums From the Past Decade That Deserve Classic Status". In October 2013, the magazine ranked the album as the best hip hop album of the last five years. In 2014 Pitchfork named it the best album of the 2010s so far, with Ian Cohen writing, "West broke the ground upon which the new decade's most brilliant architects built their masterworks; Bon Iver, Take Care, Channel Orange, and Good Kid, M.A.A.D City don't exist without the blueprint of My Beautiful Dark Twisted Fantasy." It was later ranked as the top album of the 2010s by The A.V. Club, Billboard, and Rolling Stone. Christgau named My Beautiful Dark Twisted Fantasy as the decade's eighth-best album, saying it remains "perversely superb".

In 2014 Spin named My Beautiful Dark Twisted Fantasy as the eighth best album of the past 30 years; Dan Weiss wrote that it is a world  combining samples, interpolations, and vocalists, admitting West does not believe "one man should have all that power" of God, yet he "lives one hell of a life". Six years later, Marc Hogan from Pitchfork considered it among the great art pop albums of the last 20 years to "have filled the void of full-length statements with both artistic seriousness and mass appeal that was formerly largely occupied by [rock] guitar bands". In 2017, the staff of HipHopDX wrote the album is "widely considered [West's] magnum opus" and the release that made the public's perception of him positive again. EW picked My Beautiful Dark Twisted Fantasy as the eighth greatest album of all time in 2016, while it was ranked 21st and 17th on the lists by NME and Rolling Stone in 2013 and 2020, respectively. The album was also included in the book 1001 Albums You Must Hear Before You Die.

Industry awards 
My Beautiful Dark Twisted Fantasy won awards for both Album of the Year and Reader's Choice: Best Album at the 2010 HipHopDX Awards, receiving over 50 percent of the vote for the latter. The album was awarded CD of the Year at the next year's BET Hip Hop Awards, while it was nominated for Outstanding Album at the 2011 NAACP Image Awards. The album received a nomination for Top Rap Album at the 2011 Billboard Music Awards, though ultimately lost to fellow rapper Eminem's Recovery.

For the 54th Annual Grammy Awards in 2012, My Beautiful Dark Twisted Fantasy was awarded Best Rap Album, while "All of the Lights" was nominated for Song of the Year, Best Rap Song, and Best Rap/Sung Collaboration, winning in the latter two categories. However, The Recording Academy's decision not to nominate My Beautiful Dark Twisted Fantasy for Album of the Year was viewed by many media outlets as a snub, along with the rejection of Watch the Throne in the category. Writing for the Los Angeles Times, Randall Roberts pinpointed the exclusion of My Beautiful Dark Twisted Fantasy – "the most critically acclaimed album of the year, a career-defining record" – as a snub in favor of nominating less substantial albums. Time journalist Touré deemed West's nominations in minor Grammy categories as "booby prizes" and stated that the album was "by far the best reviewed album in many years", being lauded by critics "like nothing since Radiohead's zenith", while achieving success with over 1,200,000 sales. The journalist questioned what happened, "How is it Grammy overlooked Kanye's magnum opus and gave noms to four sonic widgets and Adele's 21?" Touré explored possible reasons for the Academy to snub West, including split votes between My Beautiful Dark Twisted Fantasy and Watch the Throne, concerns over his past controversies, and more commercially appealing nominees, but ultimately perceived "a lack of respect for hip hop and its complexity" from those who are into music, yet lack knowledge of the genre. He concluded that despite West releasing "his most mature work, he's being ignored".

Having been vocal about snubs for major categories of award shows in the past, West responded to the Grammy nominees onstage during a concert on the Watch the Throne Tour, saying he realized it was "my fault for dropping Watch the Throne and Dark Fantasy the same year. I should've just spaced it out, just a little bit more." Writing for NME on the 10th anniversary of My Beautiful Dark Twisted Fantasy, Will Lavin recalled that despite winning Best Rap Album, "it was snubbed for Best Album without so much as a nomination". Two years later, Vibe listed the record as one of 10 rap albums snubbed of Album of the Year, with Preezy Brown mentioning this was "a Grammy snub that's one of the more egregious in recent memory".

Track listing 

Track notes
 signifies a co-producer
 signifies an additional producer
"Dark Fantasy" features background vocals by Nicki Minaj and Bon Iver member Justin Vernon, and additional vocals by Teyana Taylor and Amber Rose
"Gorgeous" features background vocals by Tony Williams
"Power" features additional vocals by Dwele
"All of the Lights" features additional vocals by Rihanna, Kid Cudi, Tony Williams, The-Dream, Charlie Wilson, John Legend, Elly Jackson of La Roux, Alicia Keys, Elton John, Fergie, Ryan Leslie, Drake, Alvin Fields and Ken Lewis
"Runaway" features background vocals by Tony Williams and additional vocals by The-Dream
"Hell of a Life" features additional vocals by Teyana Taylor and The-Dream
"Blame Game" features additional vocals by Chris Rock and Salma Kenas
"Lost in the World" and "Who Will Survive in America" feature additional vocals by Charlie Wilson, Kaye Fox, Tony Williams, Alicia Keys and Elly Jackson of La Roux

Sample credits
"Dark Fantasy" contains samples of "In High Places", written by Mike Oldfield and Jon Anderson, and performed by Anderson.
"Gorgeous" contains portions and elements of the composition "You Showed Me", written by Gene Clark and Roger McGuinn, and performed by The Turtles.
"Power" contains elements from "It's Your Thing", performed by Cold Grits; elements of "Afromerica", written by Francois Bernheim, Jean-Pierre Lang, and Boris Bergman, and performed by Continent Number 6; and material sampled from "21st Century Schizoid Man", composed by Robert Fripp, Michael Giles, Greg Lake, Ian McDonald, and Peter Sinfield, and performed by King Crimson.
"So Appalled" contains samples of "You Are – I Am", written by Manfred Mann, and performed by Manfred Mann's Earth Band.
"Devil in a New Dress" contains samples of "Will You Love Me Tomorrow", written by Carole King and Gerry Goffin, and performed by Smokey Robinson.
"Runaway" contains a sample of "Expo 83", written by J. Branch, and performed by Backyard Heavies; and excerpts from Rick James Live at Long Beach, CA, 1981.
"Hell of a Life" contains samples of "She's My Baby", written by Sylvester Stewart, and performed by The Mojo Men; samples of "Stud-Spider" by Tony Joe White; and portions of "Iron Man", written by Terence Butler, Anthony Iommi, John Osbourne, and William Ward, and performed by Black Sabbath.
"Blame Game" contains elements of "Avril 14th", written by Richard James, and performed by Aphex Twin.
"Lost in the World" contains portions of "Soul Makossa", written by Manu Dibango; a sample of "Think (About It)", written by James Brown, and performed by Lyn Collins; samples of "Woods", written by Justin Vernon, and performed by Bon Iver; and "Comment No. 1", written and performed by Gil Scott-Heron.
"Who Will Survive in America" contains samples of "Comment No. 1" performed by Gil Scott-Heron.

Personnel 
Credits adapted from the album's liner notes.

Musicians 
 Jeff Bhasker – keyboards (tracks 1, 3, 5, 7, 9, 12, 13), piano (track 6), cello arrangement (track 1)
 Mike Dean – keyboards (tracks 3, 5, 7, 10), piano (tracks 1, 8, 11), bass (tracks 3, 8, 11), guitars (tracks 3, 8), guitar solo (track 2), cello arrangement (tracks 1, 5, 7)
 Ken Lewis – guitars (track 2), bass (track 2), organ (track 2), brass and woodwinds (track 5), tribal drum programming (track 12, 13), horn arrangement (track 5), chant vocals (tracks 3, 12, 13)
 Brent Kolatalo – keyboards (track 2), drum programming (track 2)
 Anthony Kilhoffer – additional drum programming (tracks 10, 12, 13)
 Danny Flam – brass and woodwinds (track 5)
 Tony Gorruso – brass and woodwinds (track 5)
 Rosie Danvers – orchestral arrangement and conducting (track 5), cello (track 5)
 Chris "Hitchcock" Chorney – cello (tracks 1–3, 5, 7, 9, 11), cello arrangement (track 11)
 Mike Lovatt – trumpet (tracks 4, 5)
 Simon Finch – trumpet (tracks 4, 5)
 Alvin Fields – chant vocals (tracks 3, 12, 13)

Production 
 Andrew Dawson – recording (tracks 1–3, 5–13), mixing (tracks 1, 10, 11)
 Anthony Kilhoffer – recording (tracks 1–3, 5–10, 12, 13), mixing (tracks 2, 5, 9–13)
 Mike Dean – recording (tracks 1–3, 5–10, 12, 13), mixing (tracks 1, 4, 6–8, 10, 11)
 Noah Goldstein – recording (tracks 1, 2, 4, 5, 7, 8, 10–13)
 Phil Joly – recording (tracks 2, 4), engineering assistance (tracks 1, 2, 5, 11)
 Christian Mochizuki – recording (track 2), engineering assistance (tracks 1, 2, 5–10, 12, 13)
 Pete Bischoff – recording (track 7), engineering assistance (tracks 2, 5–8, 10, 12, 13)
 Ryan Gilligan – recording (track 11)
 Marcos Tovar – recording (Rihanna vocals; track 5)
 Manny Marroquin – mixing (track 3)
 Gaylord Holomalia – engineering assistance (tracks 1, 6–8, 10)
 Alex Graupera – engineering assistance (tracks 12, 13)
 Christian Plata – mix engineering assistance (track 3)
 Erik Madrid – mix engineering assistance (track 3)
 Cary Clark – mix engineering assistance (track 9)
 Ken Lewis – chant vocals engineering (track 3)
 Brent Kolatalo – chant vocals engineering (tracks 3, 12, 13), horn engineering (track 5)
 TommyD – orchestra production (track 5)
 Vlado Meller – mastering

Design 
 Kanye West – art direction
 Virgil Abloh – art direction
 George Condo – paintings
 M/M (Paris) – handwritten titles and illustrations, package design
 Fabien Montique – Kanye West photograph

Charts

Weekly charts

Year-end charts

Certifications

Release history

References

External links 
 
 

2010 albums
Kanye West albums
Def Jam Recordings albums
Roc-A-Fella Records albums
Grammy Award for Best Rap Album
Concept albums
Obscenity controversies in music
Albums produced by Bink (record producer)
Albums produced by DJ Frank E
Albums produced by Emile Haynie
Albums produced by Jeff Bhasker
Albums produced by Kanye West
Albums produced by Mike Dean (record producer)
Albums produced by Lex Luger
Albums produced by No I.D.
Albums produced by RZA
Albums produced by Symbolyc One
Albums recorded at Electric Lady Studios